Eucephalus elegans is a North American species of flowering plants in the family Asteraceae known by the common name elegant aster. It is native to the western United States, largely the Great Basin, in the states of Colorado, Idaho, Montana, Nevada, Oregon, Utah, Wyoming.

Eucephalus elegans is a perennial herb up to 70 cm (28 inches) tall, with a woody caudex. One plant will usually produce 3-15 flower heads in a showy array. Each head has 5–8 purple ray florets surrounding numerous yellow  disc florets.

References

External links
Wild Utah, Elegant Aster, Eucephalus elegans, Asteraceae (Sunflower Family) photos
Southwest Colorado Wildflowers photos

Astereae
Flora of the Western United States
Plants described in 1840
Flora without expected TNC conservation status